The Eumaeini are a tribe of gossamer-winged butterflies (family Lycaenidae). They are typically placed in the subfamily Theclinae, but sometimes considered a separate subfamily Eumaeinae. Over 1,000 species are found in the Neotropical realm

Systematics
As not all Theclinae have been assigned to tribes, the genus list is preliminary. However, much progress has been made in sorting out the profusion of synonymous taxa, and at least some degree of stability has been achieved in the early years of the 21st century. While there is no good phylogenetic hypothesis yet for the subfamily, groups of at least apparently related genera have been delimited. They are sometimes called "sections", but do not correspond to the taxonomic rank of section (the section in which the gossamer-winged butterflies are placed is the Cossina); if validated as clades and assigned taxonomic rank, they would qualify as subtribes.

There is still much work to be done, including the splitting of such notorious "wastebin taxa" as Callophrys, and the establishment of a robust phylogenetic and evolutionary scenario. Pending this, the groups are listed here in the presumed phylogenetic sequence, while genera are simply sorted alphabetically.

Eumaeus group
 Eumaeus
 Mithras (including Paraspiculatus)
 Paiwarria (including Fasslantonius)
 Theorema
Brangas group
 Brangas
 Dabreras  
 Enos (including Chopinia, Falerinota)
 Evenus (including Cryptaenota, Endymion, Ipocia, etc.)
 Lamasina (= Annamaria)
 Thaeides
Atlides group
 Arcas
 Atlides (including Riojana)
 Pseudolycaena
 Theritas (including Aveexcrenota, Denivia, Lucilda, etc.)
Micandra group (formerly in Atlides group)
 Brevianta
 Busbiina
 Ianusanta 
 Ipidecla
 Johnsonita
 Micandra (including Egides)
 Penaincisalia (including Abloxurina, Candora, etc.)
 Phothecla
 Podanotum
 Rhamma (including Paralustrus, Pontirama, Shapiroana)
 Salazaria
 Temecla
 Timaeta (including Jagiello, Trochusinus)
Thereus group
 Arawacus – stripestreaks
 Contrafacia
 Kolana
 Rekoa
 Thereus (including Noreena, Pedusa)
Satyrium group
 Chlorostrymon
 Magnastigma
 Ocaria (including Lamasa, Variegatta)
 Phaeostrymon
 Satyrium (including Harkenclenus, Neolycaena, etc.) 
Callophrys group
 Callophrys (including Incisalia, Mitoura, Xamia, etc.) – green hairstreaks and elfins
 Cyanophrys
Thestius group
 Bistonina
 Megathecla (including Cupathecla, Gullicaena)
 Lathecla
 Thestius 
Allosmaitia group
 Allosmaitia
 Janthecla
 Laothus

Lamprospilus group (groundstreaks and allies)
 Arumecla
 Calycopis (including Calystryma, Femniterga, etc.)
 Camissecla
 Electrostrymon (including Angulopis)
 Lamprospilus
 Ziegleria (including Kisutam)
Strymon group (scrub hairstreaks)
 Strymon (including Eiseliana)
Tmolus group
 Exorbaetta
 Gargina
 Ministrymon
 Nicolaea
 Ostrinotes
 Siderus
 Strephonota (including Dindyminotes, Letizia, etc.)
 Theclopsis (including Asymbiopsis)
 Tmolus
Panthiades group
 Beatheclus Bálint & Dahners, 2006
 Ignata
 Michaelus
 Oenomaus
 Olynthus
 Panthiades (including Cycnus)
 Parrhasius
 Porthecla
 Thepytus
Hypostrymon group
 Apuecla
 Aubergina
 Balintus
 Celmia (including Cyclotrichia)
 Dicya (including Caerofethra)
 Hypostrymon
 Iaspis
 Marachina
 Nesiostrymon
 Terenthina
 Trichonis
Erora group
 Erora
 Chalybs
 Semonina
 Symbiopsis

Unplaced (TOL)
 Badecla

Footnotes

References

  (2008): Tree of Life Web Project – Eumaeini. Version of 2008-APR-24. Retrieved 2008-NOV-11.
  (2008): Markku Savela's Lepidoptera and Some Other Life Forms: Theclinae. Version of 2008-SEP-05. Retrieved 2008-NOV-11.

 
Theclinae
Taxa named by Henry Doubleday
Butterfly tribes